The 1990–91 Pilkington Cup was the 20th edition of England's, premier (at that time) rugby union club competition. Harlequins won the competition, for the second time, defeating Northampton 25 – 13 at Twickenham. The event was sponsored by Pilkington.

First round

Second round

Third round

Fourth round

Quarter-finals

Semi-finals

Final

Sponsorship
The competition was sponsored by Pilkington who had provided £700,000 over the first three seasons and agreed to a further three years worth £1,000,000.

References

1990–91 rugby union tournaments for clubs
1990–91 in English rugby union
1990-91